The People's United Party was a left-wing political party in South Korea that was formed on 27 February 2016. Many of its members came from the Unified Progressive Party.

The party participated in the 2016 South Korean legislative election and the 2017 South Korean presidential election but none of its candidates won.

The party was officially combined with New People's Political Party on 15 October 2017, as the new party named Minjung Party.

References

External links
 

2016 establishments in South Korea
2017 disestablishments in South Korea
Defunct political parties in South Korea
Korean nationalist parties
Left-wing nationalism in South Korea
Left-wing nationalist parties
Minjung
Political parties disestablished in 2017
Political parties established in 2016
Progressive parties in South Korea